The British–Irish Intergovernmental Conference (BIIGC) is an intergovernmental organisation established by the Governments of Ireland and the United Kingdom under the Good Friday Agreement in 1998. It first met in London in 1999, and the latest meeting took place at Farmleigh House in Dublin on 19 January 2023.

When the Northern Ireland Assembly is suspended, devolved matters revert to the BIIGC's remit. The BIIGC guarantees the Government of Ireland a say in areas of bilateral co-operation and on those matters not yet devolved to the Northern Ireland Assembly or the North/South Ministerial Council.

The BIIGC is normally chaired by the Irish Minister for Foreign Affairs and the Secretary of State for Northern Ireland. Provision is made however for meetings at summit level, i.e. between the Taoiseach and Prime Minister, as required. Summit meetings of the BIIGC took place in 1999, 2005 and 2018. There is also provision under the Belfast Agreement for Members of the Legislative Assembly to be involved in the intergovernmental conference but they do not have the power to block decisions taken by the two governments.

History
The establishment of the BIIGC was provided for under Strand Three of the Good Friday Agreement, signed on 8 March 1998. The inaugural meeting took place at 10 Downing Street on 17 December 1999 and was chaired by Prime Minister Tony Blair and Taoiseach Bertie Ahern and attended by representatives of the Irish government, the British government and the Northern Ireland Executive.

The BIIGC replaced the Anglo-Irish Conference which was established under Article 2 of the Anglo-Irish Agreement of 1985. Under the terms of the Belfast Agreement, the BIIGC is supported by officials of the British and Irish Governments, including a standing Joint Secretariat of officials dealing with non-devolved Northern Ireland matters. The BIIGC secretariat has approximately 21 staff (10 for the British side, 11 for the Irish side). The staff comprise a mix of grades from senior civil servants to administrative support grades.

Devolved matters
In respect of bilateral co-operation these include:
Asylum and immigration, including Common Travel Area issues
European Union and international issues
Social security including methods of fraud detection
Education
Policy on misuse of drugs: combating organised crime and associated money laundering
Fiscal issues

Non-devolved matters
In respect of non-devolved matters issues include:
Rights
Policing, including implementation of the Patten Report
Criminal justice
Normalisation of security arrangements and practices
Cross-border security co-operation
Victims of violence
Prison issues
Drugs and drug trafficking
Broadcasting

Criminal justice co-operation
Under an international agreement between the UK and Ireland on "Co-operation on Criminal Justice Matters" signed in 2005, the Northern Ireland minister responsible for justice reports to the BIIGC on certain matters. This is because the Agreement provides that the Ministers of the governments of the United Kingdom and Ireland (hereinafter referred to as "the Ministers") responsible for criminal justice matters in the two jurisdictions (Ireland and Northern Ireland) shall meet at least annually for the purpose of facilitating more effective co-operation and co-ordination on criminal justice matters, including in combating criminal behaviour, working together in the prevention of crime and on community safety issues, and dealing with offenders after conviction. Such meetings shall be referred to hereinafter as Ministerial Meetings on criminal justice co-operation. The Agreement provides that such meetings shall operate under the auspices of, and be accountable to, the British–Irish Intergovernmental Conference.

Meetings
The following is a list of meetings of the BIIGC:

1–17 December 1999 (Summit Level Meeting)
2–22 October 2002
3–18 December 2002
4–20 May 2003
5–2 July 2003
6–18 September 2003
7–22 January 2004
8–21 April 2004
9–7 July 2004
10–15 December 2004
11–2 March 2005
12–27 June 2005 (Summit Level Meeting)
13–19 October 2005
14–1 February 2006
15–2 May 2006
16–25 July 2006
17–24 October 2006
18–26 February 2007
25 July 2018
2 November 2018
8 May 2019
24 June 2021
2 December 2021
23 March 2022
7 October 2022
19 January 2023

See also
British-Irish Council
North/South Ministerial Council
Belfast Agreement
Northern Ireland Executive
Government of the United Kingdom
Government of Ireland

References

External links
Agreement between the Government of Ireland and the Government of the United Kingdom of Great Britain and Northern Ireland establishing a British-Irish Intergovernmental Conference
Irish Government – British-Irish Intergovernmental Conference

Government of Northern Ireland
Politics of the Republic of Ireland
Ireland–United Kingdom relations
Northern Ireland peace process
Politics of the British Isles
1998 establishments in the United Kingdom
1998 establishments in Ireland